The Tollcross International Swimming Centre is a swimming pool and leisure centre in Glasgow. It hosted the Swimming events at the 2014 Commonwealth Games. The centre hosted the IPC Swimming World Championships during July 2015.

Technical features
It has one Olympic standard 50 metre swimming pool, which was extensively upgraded, and a second 50-metre pool which was added as a warm-up facility. The pool was reopened on 24 May 2013. The seating capacity of the Pool is 2,000, rising to 5,000 with temporary seating during the Commonwealth Games. Additional upgrades were made in 2017 in preparation for the 2018 European Aquatics Championships, which included repairs, a new roof, and electrical and mechanical equipment additions.

Notable events
 British Swimming Championships: 2014, 2016, 2019
 British Swimming Glasgow Meet: 2021
 Commonwealth Games: 2014
 Duel in the Pool: 2013
 European Aquatics Championships: 2018
 European Short Course Swimming Championships: 2019
 European Sports Championships: 2018
 World Para Swimming Championships: 2015

References

External links
Official website

Buildings and structures completed in 1997
Sports venues in Glasgow
Swimming venues in Scotland
2014 Commonwealth Games venues
Commonwealth Games swimming venues
1997 establishments in Scotland
2018 European Aquatics Championships